Rakta Sindhuram is a 1985 Indian Telugu-language film directed by A. Kodandarami Reddy. The film stars Chiranjeevi Radha and Kaikala Satyanarayana. It is based on the novel of the same name by Yandamuri Veerendranath.

Plot

Cast 
 Chiranjeevi as Police Inspector Gopi / Gandragoddali (dual role)
 Radha as Rekha
 Kaikala Satyanarayana as Damodar Rao
 Gummadi as Superintendent of Police Jagannatham
 Nutan Prasad as Peda Kapu
 Suthi Velu as Damodar Rao's Secretary
 Suthi Veerabhadra Rao as Doctor
 Sudarshan as Bheemaraju
 Sivaprasad as Inspector Ajay
 P.J. Sarma as Inspector General of Police
 Annapoorna as Saradamma (Gopi's mother)
 Suryakantam as Women's hostel Warden (special appearance)

Soundtrack 
All songs were written by Veturi and composed by K. Chakravarthy.

References

External links 

1980s Telugu-language films
1985 films
Films based on Indian novels
Films directed by A. Kodandarami Reddy
Films scored by K. Chakravarthy